British Army Germany, is the superior institution under which the remaining installations of the British Forces Germany are organised after the completion of the withdrawal of the British Forces from Germany in February 2020.  Apart from the Alpine Training Centre Hubertus Haus in Oberstdorf, which is in Bavaria, British Army Germany is entirely based in North Rhine-Westphalia.

History
British Army Germany was formed in 2020 to administer the remaining service personnel, UK Civil Servants, and dependents (family members), based in Germany.

Composition
The installations consist of:

Normandy Barracks, Paderborn
Headquarters, British Army Germany:
Commander British Army Germany;
Germany Enabling Office (GEO);
Germany Support Unit.
Sennelager Training Centre:
Command and Staff Trainer;
Combined Arms Tactical Trainer;
Combat Ready Training Centre. 
23 Amphibious Engineer Squadron, Royal Engineers (also located in Minden).
Exercising troops accommodation.

Athlone Barracks, Paderborn
Land Training Fleet (Sennelager) — which provides and maintains a pool of military vehicles for units in training at Sennelager; thus units in training do not need to bring their own vehicles for the time of the exercise;
Exercising troops technical accommodation.

Ayrshire Barracks, Mönchengladbach
Store Equipment Fleet (Germany) — store of vehicles and other equipment for exercises and operations around Europe.

Wulfen
Munitions storage facility

Others
Dorsten
Dorsten Ammunition Depot — munitions storage facility.
Oberstdorf
Alpine Training Centre (ATC) Hubertus-Haus — this installation provides facilities and activities, including rock climbing, kayaking, paragliding, sailing, mountain biking, and winter sports, under the auspices of the Adventurous Training Foundation Delivery (AFTD), and is maintained by military and civil personnel.
Sennelager

References

 
British Army deployments
Germany
Joint commands of the United Kingdom